Chrysopinae is the nominate subfamily of green lacewings in the insect family Chrysopidae in the order Neuroptera. This subfamily is also the largest within the family and comprises about 60 genera.

Members of the genus Chrysoperla and the genus Chrysopa in this subfamily are common in Europe and North America. Chrysopinae larvae are predatory and feed on aphids; some of these species have been used in biological pest control, as has the Australian Mallada signatus.

Genera
The following 61 genera are divided into four tribes:

incertae sedis
 Tibetochrysa Yang, 1988

Ankylopterygini Navas, 1910
 Ankylopteryx Brauer, 1864
 Parankylopteryx Tjeder, 1966
 Retipenna Brooks, 1986
 Semachrysa Brooks, 1983
 Signochrysa Brooks & Barnard, 1990

Belonopterygini Navas, 1913
 Abachrysa Banks, 1938
 Belonopteryx Gerstaecker, 1863
 Calochrysa Banks, 1943
 Chrysacanthia Lacroix, 1923
 Chrysaloysia Navas, 1928
 Dysochrysa Tjeder, 1966
 Evanochrysa Brooks & Barnard, 1990
 Italochrysa Principi, 1946
 Nacarina Navás, 1915
 Nesochrysa Navás, 1910
 Nodochrysa Banks, 1938
 Oyochrysa Brooks, 1985
 Stigmachrysa Navás, 1925
 Turnerochrysa Kimmins, 1935
 Vieira Navás, 1913

Leucochrysini Adams, 1978
 Berchmansus Navás, 1913
 Cacarulla Navas, 1910
 Gonzaga Navás, 1913
 Leucochrysa McLachlan, 1868 (including Nodita)
 Neula Navás, 1917
 Nuvol Navás, 1916
 Santocellus Tauber & Albuquerque, 2008

Chrysopini Schneider, 1851
 Anomalochrysa McLachlan, 1883
 Apertochrysa Tjeder, 1966
 Atlantochrysa Hölzel, 1970
 Austrochrysa Esben-Petersen, 1928
 Borniochrysa Brooks & Barnard, 1990
 Brinckochrysa Tjeder, 1966
 Ceraeochrysa Adams, 1982
 Ceratochrysa Tjeder, 1966
 Chrysemosa Brooks & Barnard, 1990
 Chrysocerca Weele, 1909
 Chrysopa  Leach in Brewster, 1815
 Chrysoperla Steinmann, 1964
 Chrysopidia Navás, 1911
 Chrysopodes Navás, 1913
 Cunctochrysa Hölzel, 1970
 Eremochrysa Banks, 1903
 Glenochrysa Esben-Petersen, 1920
 Himalochrysa Hölzel, 1973
 Kostka Navás, 1913
 Kymachyrsa Tauber & Garland, 2014
 Mallada Navás, 1925
 Meleoma Fitch, 1855
 Nineta Navás, 1912
 Parachrysopiella Brooks & Barnard, 1990
 Peyerimhoffina Lacroix, 1920
 Plesiochrysa Adams, 1982
 Pseudomallada Tsukaguchi, 1995
 Rexa Navás, 1920
 Suarius Navás, 1914
 Titanochrysa Sosa and Freitas, 2012
 Tumeochrysa Needham, 1909
 Ungla Navás, 1914
 Yumachrysa Banks, 1950

Gallery

References

External links

Chrysopidae
Insect subfamilies